Tomb KV58, known as the "Chariot Tomb", is located in the Valley of the Kings in Egypt. It was discovered in January 1909 by Harold Jones, excavating on behalf of Theodore M. Davis. The circumstances of the discovery and specifics of the excavation were only given a passing mention in Davis' account, who attributes the discovery to Edward Ayrton in 1907 instead.  The tomb consists of a shaft leading to a single chamber and contained only embossed gold foil, furniture knobs, and a single ushabti. The contents likely originated from the Eighteenth Dynasty tomb of Ay in WV23. Davis considered this tomb to be the burial place of the then little-known pharaoh Tutankhamun.

Discovery, excavation, and contents
The tomb was discovered on 10 January 1909 and is located between the tomb of Horemheb (KV57) and the "Gold Tomb" (KV56). The shaft opened to the west onto a single chamber. Davis, in his publication, states that the gold foil was found within a broken box, and that the ushabti was "lying on the floor in one corner." Comparison with Jones' journal reveals that this "neat picture...is almost certainly incorrect" with the gold found in the fill of both the shaft and chamber.

Given KV58's proximity to the tomb of Horemheb, it was likely cut as a satellite tomb. The single uninscribed ushabti is possible evidence of an earlier use of the tomb. Davis saw this tomb as the burial place of the then little-known pharaoh Tutankhamun.

The box handles, knobs, and gold foil bear the names of Tutankhamun, Ankhesenamun, and both the royal and non-royal names of Ay. The gold foil is embossed with designs of the king (Tutankhamun or Ay) defeating enemies with both a mace and chariot, trampling enemies as a sphinx, and practicing archery; floral designs are also present. These fragments likely represent the remains of the fittings of at least one chariot. Their ultimate origin is likely the tomb of Ay, WV23, being deposited by robbers into the half filled shaft during the official dismantling of the royal burials at the end of the New Kingdom. If this is the case, its proximity to KV57 may indicate the transfer of Ay's mummy of that tomb, which Reeves suggests was employed as a cache of royal mummies.

References

Bibliography

External links
Theban Mapping Project: KV58 includes detailed maps of most of the tombs.

1909 archaeological discoveries
Valley of the Kings